The Hydroptilidae are a large family of caddisflies (Trichoptera) with a worldwide distribution. They are commonly known as microcaddisflies or purse-case caddisflies, in reference to two characteristic traits of this family: Hydroptilidae are much smaller than other caddisflies, rarely exceeding  in length. Their larvae do not build a protective case until the final instar of their growth. At that time however, they build a typically Purse-shaped case, either portable or stuck to the substrate, in which the larva finishes growth and pupates.

Systematics and taxonomy
Their systematic placement among the caddisflies is still disputed. They are traditionally placed in the suborder Spicipalpia, which do not seem to be a natural monophyletic group, but rather an evolutionary grade of moderately advanced caddisflies. Some authors downrank the Spicipalpia to a superfamily of the more basal Annulipalpia and call them Rhyacophiloidea (which otherwise refers to a subfamily of suborder Spicipalpia), but recent studies generally rejected this view.

More often, the Hydroptilidae are placed in a monotypic superfamily Hydroptiloidea, either in the Spicipalpia or – probably more appropriately considering the present state of caddisfly phylogeny – incertae sedis in the Trichoptera. It may be that the Glossosomatoidea are particularly closely related to the Hydroptilidae; together they might even be closer to the most advanced caddisflies (the tube case caddisflies, Integripalpia) than any other living caddisfly. But this view is almost as disputed as including the Spicipalpia in the Annulipalpia. In any case, were Glossosomatoidea and Hydroptiloidea to be merged into a single superfamily, the older name Hydroptiloidea would apply for the combined group.

The peculiarly apomorphic genera Palaeagapetus and Ptilocolepus have been separated as subfamily Ptilocolepinae, while all other genera form the Hydroptilinae family with its multiple tribes. It is far from certain that the Ptilocolepinae are the living fossils such an arrangement would imply them to be.

Genera
Around 70 genera with at least 1,700 species have been described from this family:
Hydroptilinae Stephens, 1836
Acanthotrichia Wells, 1982
Acritoptila Wells, 1982
Agraylea Curtis, 1834
Allotrichia McLachlan, 1880
Austratrichia Wells, 1982
Cyclopsiella Kjaerandsen, 1997
Dhatrichia Mosely, 1948
Hellyethira Neboiss, 1977
Hydroptila Dalman, 1819
Hydroptilina Martynov, 1934
Jabitrichia Wells, 1990
Microptila Ris, 1897
Missitrichia Wells, 1991
Mulgravia Wells, 1982
Oxyethira Eaton, 1873
Paroxyethira Mosely, 1924
Paucicalcaria Mathis & Bowles, 1989
Tangatrichia Wells & Andersen, 1995
Tricholeiochiton Kloet & Hincks, 1944
Ugandatrichia Mosely, 1939
Vietrichia Olah, 1989
Wlitrichia Kjaerandsen, 1997
Xuthotrichia Mosely, 1934
Leucotrichiinae Flint, 1970
Abtrichia Mosely, 1939
Acostatrichia Mosely, 1939
Alisotrichia Flint, 1964
Anchitrichia Flint, 1970
Ascotrichia Flint, 1983
Betrichia Mosely, 1939
Celaenotrichia Mosely, 1934
Cerasmatrichia Flint, Harris & Botosaneanu, 1994
Ceratotrichia Flint, 1992
Costatrichia Mosely, 1937
Eutonella Mueller, 1921
Leucotrichia Mosely, 1934
Mejicanotrichia Harris & Holzenthal, 1997
Peltopsyche Mueller, 1879
Scelobotrichia Harris & Bueno-Soria, 1993
Zumatrichia Mosely, 1937
Neotrichiinae Ross, 1956
Kumanskiella Harris & Flint, 1992
Mayatrichia Mosely, 1937
Neotrichia Morton, 1905
Taraxitrichia Flint & Harris, 1991
Ochrotrichiinae Marshall, 1979
Angrisanoia Özdikmen, 2008
Caledonotrichia Sykora, 1967
Maydenoptila Neboiss, 1977
Metrichia Ross, 1938
Ochrotrichia Mosely, 1934
Nothotrichia Flint, 1967
Ragatrichia Oláh & Johanson, 2011
Rhyacopsyche Mueller, 1879
Orthotrichiinae Nielsen, 1948
Ithytrichia Eaton, 1873
Orthotrichia Eaton, 1873
Stactobiinae Botosaneanu, 1956
Bredinia Flint, 1968
Byrsopteryx Flint, 1981
Catoxyethira Ulmer, 1912
Chrysotrichia Schmid, 1958
Flintiella Angrisano, 1995
Niuginitrichia Wells, 1990
Orinocotrichia Harris, Flint & Holzenthal, 2002
Parastactobia Schmid, 1958
Plethus Hagen, 1887
Scelotrichia Ulmer, 1951
Stactobia McLachlan, 1880
Stactobiella Martynov, 1924
Tizatetrichia Harris, Flint & Holzenthal, 2002
incertae sedis
†Burminoptila Botosaneanu, 1981
Dibusa Ross, 1939
Dicaminus Mueller, 1879
†Electrotrichia Ulmer, 1912
Macrostactobia Schmid, 1958
†Novajerseya Botosaneanu, Johnson & P. R. Dillon, 1998
Orphninotrichia Mosely, 1934

References

External links

Trichoptera World Checklist

 
Trichoptera families